Morehead Township, North Carolina may refer to one of the following places in the State of North Carolina:

 Morehead Township, Carteret County, North Carolina
 Morehead Township, Guilford County, North Carolina

See also

Morehead (disambiguation)

North Carolina township disambiguation pages